In geometry, the square truncated trapezohedron is the second in an infinite series of truncated trapezohedra. It has 8 pentagon and 2 square faces. 

This polyhedron can be constructed by taking a tetragonal trapezohedron and truncating the polar axis vertices. The kite faces of the trapezohedron become pentagons.

The vertices exist as 4 squares in four parallel planes, with alternating orientation in the middle creating the pentagons.

A truncated trapezohedron has all valence-3 vertices. This means that the dual polyhedrona gyroelongated square dipyramid has all triangular faces.

It represents the dual polyhedron to the Johnson solid, gyroelongated square dipyramid, with specific proportions:

Polyhedra